Alfred James may refer to:
Alfred Arthur James (1887–1938), member of Queensland Legislative Assembly
Pilli Alfred James (1931–1983), Indian academic